Dennis Cooley (born August 27, 1944) is a Canadian author of poetry and criticism, a retired university professor, and a vital figure in the evolution of the prairie long poem.  He was raised on a farm near the small city of Estevan, Saskatchewan in Canada, and currently resides in Winnipeg, Manitoba. 
He is married to Diane, and is the father of two daughters, Megan and Dana. 
Dennis's self-proclaimed influences in writing are William Carlos Williams, H.D., Robert Duncan, Charles Olson, E.E. Cummings, Eli Mandel, Andrew Suknaski, Daphne Marlatt, bpNichol, Michael Ondaatje, and Robert Kroetsch.

Early life
As a student, Dennis held a variety of different labouring jobs during the summers.
First attending secondary schooling at the University of Saskatchewan, Dennis obtained with added Distinction his Bachelor of Education Degree in 1966, a High Honours Bachelor of Arts Degree in 1967 and afterwards upgraded to his Masters of Arts Degree on Stephen Crane's imagery and symbolism in 1968.

Dennis later moved to New York state to attend the University of Rochester. It was there that Dennis prepared the research for his doctorate on the San Francisco-born American poet, Robert Duncan. He received the Ph. D in 1971.

Career
From 1972 to 1973, Dennis was employed within the Blakeney Government in Saskatchewan as an executive assistant.
Apart from this, most of Dennis's working life has been teaching English. 
He has worked at St. John's College since 1976 as the Organizer of Literary Conferences within the University of Manitoba and taught Early Modern and Contemporary poetry, specializing in Robert Duncan, Dorothy Livesay, Margaret Atwood, Robert Kroetsch, Eli Mandel, Prairie Literature, the Long poem in the Twentieth Century, Canadian Writers in Self-construction, Fundamentals of Literary
Theory, American Literature, Creative Writing, Poetry & Media 1994–1995, Narratology & Postcolonialism.
He retired from in 2011.

He has since helped start create the Manitoba Writers’ Guild, and is currently President.
The Guild, founded in 1981 in Aubigny, Manitoba as a support group for Manitoba writers, offers workshops, conducts local reading groups and a peer support network for enhancing and encouraging other writers of all skill levels.

Dennis is also an editor, and from 1975 to 1976 was the Assistant Editor on the Journal of Canadian Fiction, the Poetry Editor of Arts Manitoba from 1978 to 1979 and 1982–1983, the Contributing Editor to Border Crossings from 1989 to 1993, as well as the Editor at the Pachyderm Press from 1993 onward. He also served as the Workshop Leader at the Sage Hill Writing Experience in 1992, 1998, 1999, and 2000.

Dennis is a founding editor of the Turnstone Press in Winnipeg, Manitoba, which was created in 1976 in a local Winnipeg pub. 
Turnstone promotes authors who are either landed immigrants or Canadian citizens, with fifty percent featuring local Manitoba content and Manitoban writers. Turnstone publishes a variety of genres, including fiction, non-fiction, literary criticism, and poetry. They are known for having published relatively new authors and first-time writers such as Di Brandt, John Gould, Lawerence Hill, Sylvia Legris, Margaret Sweatman, and Armin Wiebe.

The Turnstone Press is praised in western Canada for its high quality of book publishing, and has been nominated or won the Governor General's Literary Award, the Commonwealth Writer's Prize, The Giller Prize, the Leacock Prize, IMPAC Dublin Literary Award, The Lambda Awards, The Rogers Trust Prize, The Relit Awards, and other local awards.

With Danid Arnason, he runs the Internet-based Canlit archives.

Writing

Dr. Cooley specializes in different genres of poetry; such as literary travel, literary criticism, and the long poem.
He shows special interest in Canadian Literature, American Writing, modern and postmodern writing, the languages of orality and print, poetry and politics, and literary theory.
To date, Dennis has published a dozen volumes of poetry, and over a hundred various articles, columns, reviews, and interviews.

Dennis has travelled abroad to share his talent by giving workshops, lectures and readings to places such as Russia (Kiev, Odessa, Lviv, Chernivtsi, and Moscow) in May 1991, to the World Poetry Conference in Portugal in May 1995 and again in May 2001, Berlin in August 2002, Poland in April 1999, and Spain in December 1998. To benefit those who don't read his native language of English, some of his work has been translated into Portuguese, German, Chinese and Ukrainian.
Dennis gave his time to the University of Augsburg in the summer of 1996 by being the Canadian Studies guest professor.

Dennis is currently keeping busy by working on personal travel journals, poetry books, and a plethora of essays.

Bibliography

Cooley, D. (1980) Leaving. Lyrical poems about friends and family, Turnstone Press. 
Cooley, D. (1983) Fielding. Poem about Cooley's father, including his death. Thistledown Press. .
Cooley, D. (1984) Bloody Jack. Poem that plays off the narrative of Jack Krafchenko, a famous outlaw from early twentieth-century Manitoba. Turnstone Press. ; 1984
Cooley, D. (1987) Soul Searching. Poems on the mind/body binary. Red Deer College Press. ; 1987.
Cooley, D. (1987) The Vernacular Muse. Critical essays on the eye and the ear in Canadian literature. Turnstone Press. ; 1987.
Cooley, D. (1988) Dedications. Poems dedicated to friends and other writers. Thistledown Press.
Cooley, D. (1988) Perishable Light. Poems from memory, dream, fantasy, set in the Prairies. Coteau Books. 
Cooley, D. (1992) Eli Mandel and His Works. ECW Press.
Cooley, D. (1992) This Only Home. Poems on astronauts, astronomers and mariners. Turnstone Press. 
Cooley, D. (1992) Burglar of Blood. Dracula poems. Pachyderm Press.
Cooley, D. (1996) Sunfall. Selected and new poems. House of Anansi Press.
Cooley, D. (2000) Irene Poetry about the death of Cooley's mother. Turnstone Press. 
Cooley, D. (2002) Bloody Jack. 2nd. ed. University of Alberta. 
Cooley, D. (2003) Seeing Red Dracula Poems. Turnstone Press. 
Cooley, D. (2004) Country Music New Poems. Kalamalka. 
Cooley, D. (2006) The Bentleys Poems of a prairie couple. University of Alberta. 
Cooley, D. (2007) By Word of Mouth Canadian identity poems. Wilfrid Laurier. 
Cooley, D. (2008) Correction Line Reconstructing Memory poems. Thistledown Press. 
Cooley, D. The Stones Prairie Relation poems. Turnstone Press. 

Books Edited

Cooley, D (Ed.) (1981) In the Name of Narid: New Poems. Erin, ON: Porcupine's Quill.
Cooley, D (Ed.) (1981) Draft: An Anthology of Prairie Poetry. Toronto, ON: Turnstone Press.
Cooley, D (Ed.) (1980) Replacing. Toronto, ON: ECW.
Cooley, D (Ed.) (1992) Inscriptions: Prairie Poetry. Winnipeg, MB: Turnstone Press.

Recognition
Dennis is the recipient of twelve Manitoba Book Awards, and the Lifetime Achievement Award.
He has also won or been nominated for the following:

(1967-1968) University of Saskatchewan Teaching Fellowship.
(1968-1971) Canada Council award for graduate study.
(1968-1971) University of Rochester Tuition Scholarships. 
(1975) University of Manitoba Research Grant to work on the Duncan papers in the Bancroft Library at Berkeley.
(1979) Olive Beatrice Stanton award for excellence in teaching.
 (1981-1982) SSHRC Leave Fellowship.
(1987) Manitoba Arts Council Award to write a screen play based on Bloody Jack.
(1987) University of Manitoba outreach award.
(1988) Perishable Light nominated for McNally Robinson Book Award.
(1989) Western Magazine Award for arts commentary. 
(1990) Visiting Professor in Canadian Studies, University of Trier, West Germany— May–July.
(1990) Featured reader at Moorhead State University in the Thomas McGrath reading series. 
(May 5, 1995) City of Estevan official Dennis Cooley day. 
(1996) Guest Professor in Canadian Studies at Universität Augsburg. 
(2000) Irene nominated for the McNally Robinson Book of the Year Award. 
(2000) Named "Favourite Poet" in Write: Readers' Choice poll.
(2001) Irene nominated for McNaly Robinson book of the Year Award.
(2012) Departmental Distinguished Lecturer of the Year Award from the University of Windsor, Ontario for his Lecture A Lover's Question: Staging Romance in Kroetsch's The Sad Phoenician.

External links

1944 births
Living people
People from Estevan
20th-century Canadian poets
20th-century Canadian male writers
Canadian male poets
21st-century Canadian poets
Academic staff of the University of Manitoba
University of Saskatchewan alumni
Writers from Saskatchewan
Writers from Winnipeg
21st-century Canadian male writers